Levan Gulordava (born 16 June  1988 in Zugdidi) is a professional Georgian football midfielder.

Club career
Gulordava is a product of Dnipro and Arsenal Kyiv. He made his debut as professional football player in 2005 with Arsenal Kyiv. In 2008 he moved to Dnipro, where he played 9 matches and scored 6 goals. In 2010 he moved Desna Chernihiv the main club of the city of Chernihiv, here he played 13 games and scored 4 goals in Ukrainian Second League. In 2011 he moved Oleksandriya and then in Zirka Kropyvnytskyi, where he played 6 matches and scored 1 goals. He returned to Arsenal Kyiv without playing and he returned to Desna Chernihiv, where he played 8 games and finally he returned to Zugdidi in Georgia.

References

External links
Profile on website 
Profile on website 

1988 births
Living people
Sportspeople from Georgia (country)
Sportsmen from Georgia (country)
FC Desna Chernihiv players
FC Arsenal Kyiv players
FC Dnipro players
FC Oleksandriya players
FC Zirka Kropyvnytskyi players
FC Zugdidi players
Footballers from Georgia (country)
Expatriate footballers from Georgia (country)
Expatriate footballers in Ukraine
Expatriate sportspeople from Georgia (country) in Ukraine
Association football defenders